Gor Malakyan (born 12 June 1994) is an Armenian footballer who plays for Ararat.

Biography 
Gor Malakyan was born on 12 June 1994 in Yerevan, Armenia. He is the younger brother of current teammate Edgar Malakyan, with whom he has also shared squad in FC Pyunik (2011/12), Alashkert FC (2014), FC Shirak (2015) and the Armenia national football team (2016-?).
Despite Gor had originally started playing in more attacking positions, such as playmaker or secondary striker, his conditions and characteristics lead him to deeper and more defensive and balanced positions. By the time he got to FC Shirak, he had been playing central midfield - thus getting to a steady role as a defensive midfielder.
After a great performance in 2015/16 UEFA Europa League playoffs, nearly qualifying for the group stage, FC Stal Kamianske (owned by another Armenian) decided to purchase his and his older brother's services. Since then, he has cemented himself as a regular member of the team's rotation system. In July 2018 he left the organized Stal Kamianske (Feniks Bucha) and returned to Armenia to join the newly created Ararat-Armenia. On 30 July 2020, Ararat-Armenia announced the departure of Malakyan after his contract expired.

Style of play 
Malakyan currently is a defensive midfielder of playmaking pedigree. Besides his tackling and marking (defensive IQ), he makes the difference mostly because of his passing and dribbling - more often than not making contact with the ball in the deep midfield, to either pass or dribble past defenders and give shape to the offense's first few touches. Such resources could be for instance spotted easily in Armenia's epic 3–2 win over Montenegro for the 2018 FIFA World Cup qualifiers, imposing his "touch and go" passing on his teammates. Technically gifted and in a position where there are not many Armenian players at his level, Malakyan is set to be one of Armenia's near future biggest talents.

Honours

Club 
Pyunik
 Armenian Cup (2): 2012–13, 2013–14
 Armenian Supercup (1): 2011

Ararat-Armenia
 Armenian Premier League (2): 2018–19, 2019–20
 Armenian Supercup (1): 2019

References

External links 
 

1994 births
Living people
Association football midfielders
Armenian footballers
Armenia international footballers
Armenia under-21 international footballers
Armenian expatriate footballers
Expatriate footballers in Ukraine
Armenian Premier League players
Ukrainian Premier League players
FC Pyunik players
FC Shirak players
FC Stal Kamianske players
FC Alashkert players
FC Ararat-Armenia players
Armenian expatriate sportspeople in Ukraine
Footballers from Yerevan